The 1981 Spanish Grand Prix was a Formula One motor race held on 21 June 1981 at the Circuito Permanente del Jarama, Jarama, Spain. It was the seventh race of the 1981 Formula One World Championship.

Summary
The 1981 Spanish Grand Prix featured the second closest finish ever of a Formula One race: after Gilles Villeneuve's Ferrari, the four following cars finished in just 1.24 seconds. This was Villeneuve's last victory, often regarded as his tactical masterpiece.

There were some changes for this race: Eliseo Salazar had left March to join Ensign, replacing Marc Surer. Also, John Player Special sponsorship and livery returned to Team Lotus after a 2-year hiatus.

The pole went to Jacques Laffite on his Ligier-Matra with the two Williams-Cosworth of Alan Jones and Carlos Reutemann second and third ahead of John Watson's McLaren, Alain Prost's Renault and the Alfa Romeo of Bruno Giacomelli. Gilles Villeneuve was seventh.

Race day was unusually hot. At the beginning of the race Jones and Reutemann went into the lead, as Laffite made a poor start. Villeneuve jumped into third place at the first corner, damaging Prost's front wing as he took the position. At the end of the first lap Villeneuve pulled out of Reutemann's slipstream and took second place. Jones began to build a lead but on lap 14 he went off the track, when he was 10 seconds ahead of the Canadian.

This left Villeneuve with Reutemann on his tail. Behind them Watson, Laffite and Elio de Angelis began to close on the dueling leaders. Reutemann was having some trouble with his gearbox and when Laffite arrived behind him there was little the Argentine could do to stop him from overtaking. Reutemann would later drop behind Watson. The five front-runners became a train of cars, packed together for the remaining laps of the race.

Villeneuve used the power of his Ferrari engine on the straight to gain a little margin and not get overtaken by his rivals, but in the corners they were all over him. Many times Laffite pulled alongside the Canadian as they went out a corner but the Ferrari would stay ahead as the horsepower kicked in. The five remained locked together right to the flag, crossing the line covered by just 1.24 seconds to record the second-closest race in the history of Formula One.

This would be the last Spanish Grand Prix at Jarama, owing to criticism of the track being too narrow for modern Formula One, the unpleasant conditions and the small crowd (the small turn-out was probably due to the backlash of the previous year's race not being counted as a World Championship race, the announcement was made on the weekend itself); and the last Spanish Grand Prix until the  season, when it would be held at the newly built Jerez circuit in the south of the country.

Classification

Qualifying

Race

Championship standings after the race

Drivers' Championship standings

Constructors' Championship standings

Note: Only the top five positions are included for both sets of standings.

References

Spanish Grand Prix
Spanish Grand Prix
Grand Prix